Paul Nixon (born 23 September 1963 in Sunderland, Tyne and Wear, England) is a former professional footballer who played for Bristol Rovers and represented New Zealand at international level.

International career
Nixon made his All Whites debut as a substitute in a 1–0 win over Taiwan on 6 March 1988 and he ended his international playing career with 4 A-international caps to his credit, his final cap in a 0–1 loss to Saudi Arabia on 24 April 1993. He went on to coach Melville United and the women's team Claudeland Rovers.

References 

1964 births
Living people
Footballers from Sunderland
English footballers
New Zealand association footballers
Association football forwards
New Zealand international footballers
English Football League players
Bristol Rovers F.C. players
Eastern Sports Club footballers
English expatriate footballers
New Zealand expatriate association footballers
English expatriate sportspeople in Hong Kong
New Zealand expatriate sportspeople in Hong Kong
Expatriate footballers in Hong Kong